Ever since the end of the Lebanese Civil War in 1991, Lebanon has undergone a construction phase resulting in many towers being built towards its skyline. The following is a list of tallest buildings in Lebanon.

List of the Tallest Buildings in Lebanon

Tallest Building by Governorate

List of Tallest Buildings Under Construction

List of Tallest Proposed Buildings

See also
 List of tallest structures in the Middle East
 List of skyscrapers

References
General
Emporis.com - Beirut
Ramco - Real Estate Advisers
Specific

External links

Lebanon
Tallest
Lebanon
Lists of tallest buildings in the Middle East